The 2006 Women's World Open Squash Championship is the women's edition of the World Open, which serves as the individual world championship for squash players. The event took place in the Ulster Hall in Belfast, Northern Ireland from 22 to 26 November 2006. Nicol David won her second World Open title, beating Natalie Grinham in the final.

Ranking points
In 2006, the points breakdown were as follows:

Seeds

Draw & results

Note: * Q = Qualifier, * WC = Wild Card, * w/o = Walkover, * r = Retired

See also
World Open
2006 Men's World Open Squash Championship
2006 Women's World Team Squash Championships

External links
 World Open 2006 at Squashtalk

World Squash Championships
W
W
W
2000s in Northern Ireland
21st century in Belfast
Sports competitions in Belfast
Squash tournaments in the United Kingdom
2006 in British women's sport
International sports competitions hosted by Northern Ireland
November 2006 sports events in the United Kingdom
Squash